Jirina Marton (born April 19, 1946) is a Czech-born Canadian artist and illustrator.

She was born in Liberec, studied at the School of Applied Arts in Prague and continued her studies in Paris. Marton had her first exhibitions there and also began illustrating children's books. She came to Canada in 1985 and now lives in Toronto.

Her books have been published in France, Canada, Switzerland, Spain, Japan, China and Korea. Her illustrations have appeared in exhibitions in Italy, Japan and Canada.

Selected works 
 I'll Do It Myself (1989)
 Amelia's Celebration (1992), received the Grand Prize at the Itabashi Picture Book Contest
 Lady Kaguya's Secret: A Japanese Tale (1997)
 The Bear Says North: Tales from Northern Lands (2003) text by Bob Barton
 Arctic Adventures: Tales from the Lives of Inuit Artists (2007) text by Raquel Rivera
 Marja’s Skis (2007) text by Jean E. Pendziwol
 Bella's Tree (2009) text by Janet Russell, received the Governor General's Award for English-language children's illustration

References 

1946 births
Living people
Governor General's Award-winning children's illustrators
Canadian children's writers
Czech emigrants to Canada
Artists from Liberec
Canadian women illustrators